The Kurilpa state by-election, 1949 was a by-election held on 10 September 1949 for the Queensland Legislative Assembly seat of Kurilpa, based in the inner southern Brisbane suburbs of West End and South Brisbane.

The by-election was triggered by the death of Labor member Patrick Copley on 18 July 1949. The seat was a swinging seat between Labor and non-Labor, although Copley had held it since the 1932 election and it was expected to be retained by the party.

Timeline

Candidates 
The by-election attracted three candidates. The Labor Party nominated Thomas Moores, the incumbent alderman for the Kurilpa Ward on Brisbane City Council whose boundaries were identical to the Assembly seat. The Liberal Party nominated Norman Brandon, while the Communist Party nominated Anna Slater. It was the first electoral contest held since the Queensland People's Party became the Liberal Party's Queensland branch, along with the Ipswich state by-election held on the same day.

Results
Thomas Moores retained the seat for the Labor Party.

Aftermath 
Upon Moores' election, the Kurilpa Ward council seat was filled at a by-election on 12 November 1949 by Colin Bennett, who went on to be the leader of Municipal Labor on Brisbane City Council during the 1950s, and subsequently held the Legislative Assembly seat of South Brisbane from 1960 until 1972.

Moores held Kurilpa until the 1957 state election held on 3 August. He defected to the Queensland Labor Party on 26 April 1957 and on 7 May 1957 was appointed Minister for Transport to replace the outgoing Deputy Premier and minister Jack Duggan. With the loss of his seat at the election, Moores' term in the Executive Council of 3 months and 5 days was the shortest in Queensland since the six-day ministry of 1899.

See also
List of Queensland state by-elections

References 

1949 elections in Australia
Queensland state by-elections
1940s in Queensland
September 1949 events in Australia